Britain at Low Tide (also known as Shoreline Detectives) is an archaeology and social history television programme that debuted on Channel 4 in 2016, with further series in 2018 and 2019. It was originally co-hosted by former Time Team and Victorian Farm contributor, archaeologist and historian Dr. Alex Langlands and Natural History Museum palaeobiologist Dr. Tori Herridge.

History
Britain at Low Tide is an archaeology programme, focusing on intertidal archaeology, that first aired on 19 November 2016 and ran for three episodes. The premise of the programme was that the presenters, Alex Langlands and Tori Herridge visit parts of Britain's coast along with coastal archaeologists showing their finds and the history behind them.

The second series started on 17 February 2018, now fronted by Dr. Tori Herridge and supported by archaeologists from CITiZAN (Coastal and Intertidal Zone Archaeological Network), Gustav Milne and Oliver Hutchinson as well as archaeologist Charlotte Mecklenburgh. In Scotland, archaeologists Tom Dawson, Joanna Hambly and Ellie Graham from The SCAPE Trust / University of St Andrews joined the team. A blog shows behind the scenes views of the filming.

Series three consisted of three episodes and was broadcast starting on 14 September 2019. The series again featured archaeologists from CITiZAN and The SCAPE Trust.

List of episodes

Series 1

Series 2

Series 3

"*"If no viewing figures the programme did not appear in BARB top 20 figures for Channel 4.

References

External links
 

2016 British television series debuts
2019 British television series endings
2010s British documentary television series
Channel 4 documentary series
English-language television shows
Archaeology of the United Kingdom